The mewing kingfisher or Mangaia kingfisher (Todiramphus ruficollaris), known locally as the tanga‘eo, is a species of bird in the Alcedinidae, or kingfisher family.  It is endemic to Mangaia in the Cook Islands.  Its natural habitats are subtropical or tropical moist lowland forests and plantations.

Description
The mewing kingfisher is 22 cm in length, with a large head and large black bill. Similar to some other Todiramphus kingfishers, it has blue-green upper-parts, with a yellow-orange collar and head-band, and a blue-green cap.  The under-parts are white.

Conservation
It is threatened by habitat loss and by disturbance by introduced common mynas at its nesting hollows. The Taporoporo'anga Ipukarea Society, BirdLife International's partner organisation in the Cook Islands, has proposed a program to eradicate the mynas from Mangaia.

References

 Cook Islands Biodiversity: Mangaia Kingfisher. Accessed 13 May 2009.

External links

BirdLife Species Factsheet.

mewing kingfisher
Birds of Mangaia
mewing kingfisher
Taxonomy articles created by Polbot